Colonel George Charles Bingham, 5th Earl of Lucan, 1st Baron Bingham,  (13 December 1860 – 20 April 1949), known by the courtesy title of Lord Bingham from 1888 to 1914, was a British soldier and Conservative politician.

Early life
Lucan was the son of Charles Bingham, 4th Earl of Lucan, and Lady Cecilia Catherine Gordon-Lennox, one of the three daughters of Charles Gordon-Lennox, 5th Duke of Richmond. He was educated at Harrow School and then at the Royal Military College, Sandhurst.

Military career
In 1881, from Sandhurst, Lucan was commissioned into the Rifle Brigade. He fought in the Bechuanaland Expedition (1884–1885) and was awarded the Order of the Nile 3rd Class. He first retired with the rank of captain in 1896. In 1900 he joined the 1st London Rifle Volunteers (territorial army) as a major, rising to the rank of colonel. He fought again in the First World War, during which he was mentioned in despatches. He gained the rank of Honorary Brigadier-General in 1917 and retired as a Lieutenant-Colonel in 1923.

Political career
Lucan was for eighteen months a Member of Parliament (MP) for the Chertsey constituency in Surrey. He was the successful Conservative candidate at a by-election on 6 July 1904 and was defeated in the 1906 United Kingdom general election by the Liberal candidate in a landslide for that party. On his father’s death on 5 June 1914 he succeeded him as Earl of Lucan and in August of that year, a few days after Britain had declared war on Germany, he was elected as an Irish representative peer, enabling him to sit in the House of Lords. He served under David Lloyd George, Bonar Law and Stanley Baldwin as a Lord-in-Waiting (a government whip in the House of Lords) from 1920 to 1924 and under Baldwin from 1924 to 1929. In that year, he was appointed as Captain of the Honourable Corps of Gentlemen-at-Arms, a post he held until the government fell later that year. He held it again in the National Government from 1931 to 1940.

Lucan was appointed as High Sheriff of Mayo for 1902–03.
He later held for life the family's customary office of Deputy Lieutenant (D.L.) of County Mayo, to which was added the same role for Middlesex; honorary roles which meant deputizing for the Lord-Lieutenant, opening local buildings, and supporting local charities. He also served as a Justice of the Peace in local magistrates courts in Middlesex.

On 26 June 1934, Lucan was created Baron Bingham, of Melcombe Bingham, in the County of Dorset, in the peerage of the United Kingdom, giving him and his lawful heirs the right to sit in the House of Lords. His son, George, sat on the Labour benches after inheriting the peerage in 1949. However, the House of Lords Act 1999 excluded most hereditary peers from the House of Lords.

In 1922 Lucan sold his family's home since 1803 at Laleham House and most of its remaining land; the purchaser of the house was the Roman Catholic Church. He had earlier widened his father's gift of land which gave over Laleham Park for community use.

Personal life
In 1896 Lucan married Violet Sylvia Blanche Spender Clay, a daughter of Joseph Spender Clay and Elizabeth Sydney Garrett, with whom he had four children:

 George Charles Patrick Bingham, 6th Earl of Lucan (24 November 1898 – 21 January 1964)
 Lady Barbara Violet Bingham (17 August 1902 – 17 December 1963), who married John Bevan, 
  John Edward Bingham (29 February 1904 – 1992)
 Lady Margaret Bingham (16 September 1905 – 17 August 1977) married Field Marshal the 1st Earl Alexander of Tunis, son of James Alexander, 4th Earl of Caledon

The Dowager Countess of (Lady) Lucan died after their eldest son in 1972; her net estate at death was sworn as £26,433 that year; she lived at 40 Orchard Court, Portman Square.

Lucan's grandson, Richard John Bingham, 7th Earl of Lucan, who inherited the title in 1964, disappeared in 1974, after allegedly murdering his children's nanny in a failed attempt to kill his estranged wife, Veronica. He was declared legally dead in 2016.

Honours
In 1885, Lucan was awarded the Order of the Nile, 3rd Class.
During the First World War, he was awarded by Nicholas II of Russia the Order of St. Stanislas of Russia, second class. 
Lucan was appointed a Companion of the Order of the Bath (C.B.) in 1919 and a Knight Commander of the Order of the British Empire (K.B.E.) in the 1920 civilian war honours list. He was also awarded the Territorial Decoration (T.D.) in 1920. From 1920 until 1928 he was one of the King's aides-de-camp, a ceremonial honour awarded to military figures which entitles the recipient to wear aiguillettes.

Death
Lucan died in 1949 while staying at the Cavendish Hotel, Eastbourne, but by then usually lived in Westminster at 19 Orchard Court, Portman Square. His son swore net assets for probate at £14,464; two months later his son-in-law and James Hamilton, Marquess of Hamilton swore to settled land whose free value was £119,153.

Ancestry

References

External links
 
 

1860 births
1949 deaths
British Army generals of World War I
British military personnel of the Bechuanaland Expedition
Companions of the Order of the Bath
Conservative Party (UK) Baronesses- and Lords-in-Waiting
Conservative Party (UK) MPs for English constituencies
Deputy Lieutenants of Mayo
Deputy Lieutenants of Middlesex
George
Graduates of the Royal Military College, Sandhurst
High Sheriffs of Mayo
Honourable Corps of Gentlemen at Arms
Irish representative peers
Knights Commander of the Order of the British Empire
Knights Grand Cross of the Royal Victorian Order
London Regiment officers
Members of the Privy Council of the United Kingdom
Ministers in the Chamberlain peacetime government, 1937–1939
Ministers in the Chamberlain wartime government, 1939–1940
People educated at Harrow School
Politicians from County Mayo
Presidents of the Marylebone Cricket Club
Recipients of the Order of Saint Stanislaus (Russian)
Rifle Brigade officers
UK MPs 1900–1906
UK MPs who inherited peerages
UK MPs who were granted peerages
Barons created by George V
London Rifle Brigade officers
Bingham Baronets, of Castlebar